Hemeroplanes diffusa is a moth of the  family Sphingidae.

Description
This species has lateral yellow bands of colour delimiting the abdominal segments. These occur on the upperside, along the entire length. The tergites are fringed with yellow colouration.
Unlike the similar species Hemeroplanes triptolemus, the underside of is paler orange.

The upper side of the forewings have a bluish-white shading in the vicinity of the basal and postmedian regions. There is a silver mark approximately 4 to 5 mm in length.

The upper side of the hindwings are also contain a bluish-white shading in the marginal area, with the basal area having a similar colour.

Distribution
The moth has been confirmed in Colombia and Ecuador. It is possible that it also lives in Peru and Bolivia.

References

External links
 Images

Dilophonotini
Moths described in 1903